Gary R. Goyke (born May 9, 1947) is a former member of the Wisconsin State Senate and a lobbyist. He is a member of the Democratic Party.

Background 
Goyke was born in Oshkosh, Wisconsin. He attended the University of Minnesota and graduated from Saint Mary's University. Goyke worked as a staff member for U.S. Senator and Vice President Hubert Humphrey.

Political career 
Goyke was elected to the Senate in 1974 and was re-elected in 1978. In 1979, he was a candidate for the United States House of Representatives from Wisconsin's 6th congressional district in a special election following the death of William A. Steiger. He lost to Tom Petri. The following year, he ran again and lost again to Petri. Goyke remained in the Wisconsin Senate until 1983. During his time in office, Goyke served as the chair of several committees and subcommittees, including Education and State Institutions and Banking and Insurance.

Personal life 
Goyke is a member of the Fourth Degree of the Knights of Columbus. Additionally, he is a member of the Benevolent and Protective Order of Elks, the Fraternal Order of Eagles, the League of Women Voters, the Sierra Club and the Young Men's Christian Association. He is married with two sons. In November 2012, one of his sons, Evan Goyke, was elected to the Wisconsin State Assembly from the 18th district.

References

See also
The Political Graveyard

Politicians from Oshkosh, Wisconsin
Democratic Party Wisconsin state senators
University of Minnesota alumni
1947 births
Living people